Kenneth L. Durrett (December 8, 1948 – January 7, 2001) was an American professional basketball player with the National Basketball Association's Kansas City Kings and Philadelphia 76ers. A  power forward, Durrett was a star at La Salle University from 1968 to 1971.

La Salle
Durrett was born in Pittsburgh, Pennsylvania and attended Schenley High School and committed to La Salle.  Durrett played for the Explorers from 1968–71 and was a three-time recipient of the Robert V. Geasey Trophy, awarded annually to the top player in the Philadelphia Big 5 – one of only four players to accomplish this feat. Durrett finished his collegiate career with 1,679 points (23.6 per game) and led the Big 5 in scoring each of his three years.  He was a Co-MVP in the Big 5 as a sophomore in 1969, during the Explorers’ 23–1 season.  Durrett led La Salle to a berth in the 1971 National Invitation Tournament and was a Consensus second-team All-American in 1971.  He was inducted into the Big 5 Hall of Fame in 1975 and the La Salle Hall of Athletes in 1976. A knee injury ended his college career.

NBA
After completing his collegiate eligibility, Durrett was drafted by the Cincinnati Royals with the fourth pick overall in the 1971 NBA draft. Durrett, still slowed by his college knee injury, played parts of four seasons for the Royals and stayed with the franchise as they became the Kansas City-Omaha Kings. He was dealt to the Philadelphia 76ers midway through the 1974–75 NBA season and retired at the end of that season.  His career averages were 4.0 points and 1.9 rebounds per game.

After a post-playing career as a community activist and basketball coach in his native Pittsburgh, Durrett died at age 52 of an apparent heart attack.

References

External links
NBA and College stats
La Salle Hall of Athletes bio

1948 births
2001 deaths
20th-century African-American sportspeople
African-American basketball players
All-American college men's basketball players
American men's basketball players
Basketball players from Pittsburgh
Cincinnati Royals draft picks
Cincinnati Royals players
Kansas City Kings players
Lancaster Red Roses (CBA) players
La Salle Explorers men's basketball players
Parade High School All-Americans (boys' basketball)
Philadelphia 76ers players
Schenley High School alumni
Small forwards